"In My Next Life" is a song co-written and recorded by Canadian country music artist Terri Clark.  It was released in October 2007 as the second single from her unreleased album My Next Life. The song was written by Clark, Tom Shapiro and Jim Collins.

It peaked number 36 on the Billboard Hot Country Songs chart, and was her final single to chart in the United States. In Canada, it reached the top of the Billboard Canada Country chart dated February 23, 2008, and is her final Number One hit to date there.

Charts

References

2007 singles
2007 songs
Terri Clark songs
Songs written by Jim Collins (singer)
Songs written by Tom Shapiro
Songs written by Terri Clark
Song recordings produced by Garth Fundis
BNA Records singles